The Marrone VM-1 is a low wing, single place taildragger from designer Vinnie Marrone.

Design and development
The design goals for the aircraft were to have an economical, high-speed, maneuverable sport aircraft.

The aircraft rear fuselage section is modified from a J-3 Cub. The wings are built in two piece removable panels with spruce wood spars.

The aircraft was first flown and tested by the owner/builder in 1957. Ground testing and initial flights were made at Islip long island NY. Originally designed and flown as a single seater. It was modified to a 2-seat design in the late 60s or early 70s.

Operational history
The prototype flew regularly until 1987, when it was flown into trees on a high speed fly-by into the sun at an airshow at Jobstown, New Jersey.

Specifications (Marrone VM-1)

References

Homebuilt aircraft